Adam Gumpelzhaimer, also Adam Gumpeltzhaimer (1559 – 3 November 1625) was a Bavarian composer and music theorist. Born in Trostberg, he studied music with the monk Jodocus Enzmüller. In 1581 he became cantor at the Augsburg Cathedral; a post he maintained until his death there in 1625. He is best known for his compositions of sacred music. He was also a noted collector of the works of Hans Leo Hassler, amassing the largest known collection of Hassler's manuscripts and prints.

References

External links 
 
 
 

1559 births
1625 deaths
German classical composers
German music theorists
Renaissance composers
German male classical composers